Butterfly in Grey (Khang paed) is a 2002 Thai drama film.

Cast
Srungsuda Lawanprasert as Dao-sawai
Kanokporn Losiri as Arunwan
Pitchanart Sakakorn as Iad
Patharawarin Timkul as Malee

External links

Film review at Thai Film Journal

2002 films
Thai-language films
2002 drama films
Thai drama films